Gerland may refer to:

People
 Saint Gerland of Agrigento (died 1100), bishop of Agrigento, Sicily
 Gerland (mathematician), 11th-century English mathematician

People with the surname
 Georg Gerland (1833–1919), German anthropologist and geophysicist
 Gunilla Gerland (born 1963), Swedish writer and activist
 Hermann Gerland (born 1954), German football player and manager
 Karl Gerland (1905–1945), Nazi leader

Places
 Gerland, Lyon, a quarter of Lyon, France
 Gerland, Côte-d'Or, a commune in France
 Parc de Gerland, a park in Lyon, France

Other uses
Gerland Corporation, an American retail company